Marilena is a female given name that may refer to:

Marilena Ansaldi
Marilena Doiciu
Marilena Georgiou
Marilena Kirchner
Marilena Marin
Marilena Neacșu
Marilena Preda Sânc
Marilena de Souza Chaui
Marilena Vlădărău
Marilena Widmer

Feminine given names